The Abbey Christian Brothers' Grammar School (Irish: Scoil na Mainistreach, Iúr Cinn Trá) is a voluntary day school for boys aged 11 – 18 years in Newry, County Down, Northern Ireland.

History
The school was established in 1851 by members of the Congregation of Christian Brothers. It was named after a Cistercian Abbey founded on the site by St Malachy in 1144. Since then the school had been located at several sites around Newry including Chapel Street, Kilmorey Street, the Carstands at Margaret Street and the Mall, then on to AbbWiey Yard. From 1966 to 2010 it was located at Courtenay Hill. In 2010, it moved to a new £18 million building on the outskirts of Newry. The school gives its name to many streets surrounding the former site such as Abbey Yard and Abbey Heights.

The school was originally entirely run by the Irish Christian Brothers, but in the late twentieth century their numbers declined and the school is now entirely staffed by lay teachers.  It is now under the trusteeship of the Edmund Rice Schools Trust (NI).

Academics
The school provides instruction in a range of academic subjects.  In 2018, 94.5% of its entrants achieved five or more GCSEs at grades A* to C, including the core subjects English and Maths.

77.2% of its students who sat the A-level exams were awarded three A*-C grades.

Achievements 

 Winners of the NI Regional Senior Schools Quiz Challenge (general knowledge quiz) 2011–2018.
 The Dalton All Ireland Gaelic Schools Cup 2006. 
 Winners of the Senior UK Schools Quiz Challenge (general knowledge quiz) 2002.
 Winners of the MacRory Cup (Gaelic football competition) 1954.
 Runners-up of the BM Quizzing Championships (NI Schools General Knowledge Quizzing Championships) 2022/2023.

Notable former pupils

 Frank Aiken (1898-1983) TD, Irish Republican Army commander, Tánaiste and served as Minister for Defence (1932–39), Minister for the Co-ordination of Defensive Measures (1939–45), Minister for Finance (1945–48) and Minister for External Affairs (1951–54; 1957–69)
Séamus Mallon (1936-2020), Member of Parliament (MP) for Newry & Armagh (1986-2005), Social Democratic and Labour Party (SDLP) Deputy Leader (1979-2001) and Deputy First Minister of Northern Ireland (1998-2001). 
 Mickey Brady (b. 1950), Sinn Féin MP for Newry and Armagh (UK Parliament constituency)  
 Art Cosgrove (b. 1940), Irish historian, writer; Chancellor, University College Dublin
 Denis Donoghue (1928-2021), Irish writer
 Kevin McKernan (b. 1987), Down GAA Gaelic footballer
 Peter McVerry (b. 1944), poverty campaigner
 Eunan O'Neill (b. 1982), Television presenter (Russia Today)
 Seán O'Neill (b. 1938), Gaelic footballer
 Ronan Rafferty (b. 1964), Irish golfer
 Patrick Shea (1908-1986), Northern Irish civil servant
 Gerard Murphy (1948-2018) – actor
 Oisín McConville (born 1975) – Gaelic footballer
 Joe Kernan (born 1954) – Gaelic footballer

See also 
 List of secondary schools in Belfast

References

External links
 Abbey Christian Brothers' Grammar School
 BM Quizzing Championships

Congregation of Christian Brothers secondary schools in Northern Ireland
Education in Newry
 
Secondary schools in County Down
Educational institutions established in 1851
Boys' schools in Northern Ireland
Grammar schools in County Down